Space Raid! is a 1978 board game published by House of Pilgrim.

Gameplay
Space Raid! is a game in which each player commands a fleet of 48 ships, divided into six ship classes.

Reception
David Ladyman reviewed Space Raid! in The Space Gamer No. 42. Ladyman commented that "I believe the designers are trying very hard to convince you that this game is worth playing. [...] If you are a wargamer, it isn't. It isn't challenging enough for regular gaming, or fun enough for those 3 a.m. sessions. Even for your 8-year-old niece or nephew, I think you could make a better buy, at half the price."

References

Board games introduced in 1978